Frank McMahon may refer to:

 Frank McMahon (oilman) (1902–1986), Canadian businessman
 Frank McMahon (author) (1919–1984), Irish American writer and playwright
 Frank McMahon (footballer) (born 1950), Northern Irish footballer
 Frank McMahon (poet) (1926–2010), Australian writer and poet